Come on Over is a 1922 American comedy silent black and white film directed by Alfred E. Green and based on the stage musical by Rupert Hughes. It stars Colleen Moore. Its release beat The Wall Flower to the theaters and it was well received.

Plot
As described in a film magazine, L. William O'Connell (Moore) bids a fond goodbye to Shane O'Mealia (Graves) when he sets sail from Ireland to the United States. He promises that he will send for her. Three years then go by. He has ill luck in New York City, where he loses one job after another. After he helps Dugan (Collins) reform from drink, the daughter Judy (O'Connor) falls in love with Shane. Finally, Moyna comes to America with the Morahans and, misunderstanding Shane's interest in Judy, flies into a tantrum. However, it all ends happily.

Cast
 Colleen Moore as Moyna Killiea
 Ralph Graves as Shane O'Mealia
 J. Farrell MacDonald as Michael Morahan
 Kate Price as Delia Morahan
 James A. Marcus as Carmody (as James Marcus)
 Kathleen O'Connor as Judy Dugan
 Florence Drew as Bridget Morahan
 Harold Holland as Myle Morahan
Mary Warren as Kate Morahan
 Elinor Hancock as Mrs. Van Dusen
 Monte Collins as Dugan
 C.E. Mason as Barney
 C.B. Leasure as Priest

References

External links

Silent American comedy films
1922 comedy films
1922 films
American silent feature films
American black-and-white films
Films directed by Alfred E. Green
Films based on works by Rupert Hughes
Goldwyn Pictures films
1920s American films